Østby is a village in Trysil municipality, Innlandet county, Norway. The population of the village in 2003 was 205. but since 2004 it is not considered an urban settlement by Statistics Norway, and its data is therefore no longer tracked separately.

In Østby, there is a community house, a supermarket, a school, a hotel, and Østby Church. The hotel is also known as training location for cross country events. In the surroundings of Østby are several cross country tracks of which some are illuminated. Every year takes the Trysil Skimaraton (42195) place in Østby. The starting point of the Skimaraton is the Kjølen Hotell.

References

Trysil
Villages in Innlandet